Dr. Marcus D. Floyd (born October 12, 1978 in Bartow, Florida) is a minister at Burkett Chapple P.B. Church and former American football cornerback for the New York Jets, Buffalo Bills and Carolina Panthers. He played college football at Indiana University.

Ministry 

·2014–Present Senior Pastor of Burkett Chapple P.B. Church

·2015 Bible Expositor for Church School Convention of the East Florida District P.B. Association

·2016–Present Church School Convention President of the East Florida District P.B. Association

·2019–Present Founder and CEO at Marcus D. Floyd Ministries

·2020 First airing of his weekly TV broadcast The Empowered Life with Dr. Marcus D. Floyd on the Christian Television Network.

Football career

High school 

Floyd earned all-state recognition as a senior at Bartow High School. He rushed for 1,002 yards and 14 touchdowns and helped lead his team to the 1996 Florida 4A state championship. Floyd had his #24 Jersey retired by Bartow Senior High School on October 4, 2013.

College career 

At Indiana University, Floyd made 86 tackles, three interceptions, five pass deflections, two forced fumbles, and two fumble recoveries in two seasons as a defensive back. He switched from running back to defensive back midway through his red shirt junior year in 1999. In 2001, Floyd won the Ted Verlihay Award, given annually to the player who demonstrates the best mental attitude and loyalty to the Hoosier football program. He made 46 tackles, three interceptions, five pass deflections, one forced fumble and one fumble recovery while playing as a graduate student. In 2000, as a senior, Floyd started the final four games and made 40 tackles, one forced fumble and one fumble recovery. In 1999, as a junior, Floyd red shirted. In 1998, as a second year student (sophomore), Floyd moved to running back and made 315 yards on 64 carries. In 1997, as a freshman, Floyd began his career as a wide receiver and made one catch. Floyd was the winner of the Hoosier Strength and Conditioning challenge in both 1998 and 2001.

NFL 

Floyd was originally signed as an undrafted rookie free agent by the New York Jets in 2002. He saw action in the Jets' first two games of the regular season, contributing two special teams tackles, and was inactive for one contest. He was then waived by the Jets. Floyd was then signed by the Buffalo Bills for their practice squad, but eventually was signed to the active roster for the final two contests of the season and recorded six special teams stops. He remained with the Bills until being waived prior to the 2003 season and was signed by the Carolina Panthers for the 2004 season after sitting out for all of 2003. Floyd played for the Carolina Panthers in 2004 and 2005. He was also allocated by the Carolina Panthers to play in NFL Europe, where he was the second cornerback drafted in the 2004 NFL Europe draft.

Education 

Floyd earned a Bachelor of Science degree in Communications from Indiana University in 2001. Floyd also earned a Master of Arts degree in Christian Leadership in 2008 and a Master of Divinity degree in 2010 from Liberty University. He is graduated with a Doctor of Ministry degree from Liberty University in October 2020.

References

External links
 Dr. Floyd's Official Website

1978 births
Living people
People from Bartow, Florida
Baptist ministers from the United States
American football cornerbacks
Indiana Hoosiers football players
New York Jets players
Buffalo Bills players
Cologne Centurions (NFL Europe) players
Bartow High School alumni